Placement Group C of the 1998 Fed Cup Asia/Oceania Zone Group II was one of six pools in the Asia/Oceania Zone Group II of the 1998 Fed Cup. The three teams that placed third in the initial pools competed in a round robin competition, with the team placing last relegated to Group II for 1999.

Singapore vs. Iraq

Singapore vs. Syria

Syria vs. Iraq

See also
Fed Cup structure

References

External links
 Fed Cup website

1998 Fed Cup Asia/Oceania Zone